There are several rivers named Cachoeira River in Brazil:

 Cachoeira Grande River, Bahia
 Cachoeira River (Bahia)
 Cachoeira River (Paraná)
 Cachoeira River (Potinga River tributary), Paraná
 Cachoeira River (Joinville), Santa Catarina
 Cachoeira River (Timbó River tributary), Santa Catarina
 Cachoeira River (São Paulo)